
The Children's Bach is a chamber opera by the Australian composer Andrew Schultz to a libretto by Glenn Perry, based on the 1984 novella of the same name by Helen Garner. The work was commissioned by the Melbourne-based group Chamber Made and their Artistic Director Douglas Horton with the aid of an Australia Council Project Fellowship; it premiered at the Malthouse theatre's Merlyn Theatre on 20 June 2008.

Roles

The work is of 80 minutes duration and is scored for a cast of six, and six instrumentalists (violin, cello, double bass, clarinet, percussion, piano).

Synopsis

References

External links

 (Review)

Operas
English-language operas
2008 operas
Operas set in Australia
Operas based on novels